Libba', Laba is a type of Yemeni cheese. It is mostly eaten in rural areas of Yemen and Somalia as well. The libba is not sold as a product or in restaurants.

Etymology 
The word libba means colostrum in Arabic.

Preparation

Traditional way 
After a cow or a goat give birth, her milk is taken and boiled in a tannour. Shathab (ruta graveolens), nigella sativa seeds, salt and smoked ghee (Samn makbi) are added to the milk while it is boiling.

Modern way
Yemeni people in the cities who don't have goats or cows prepare the libba using different ingredients: 8 eggs, 1 cup of milk, 1 cup of dairy milk, 2 cup of condensed milk, a small amount of citric acid or lemon and salt, half teaspoon of yeast, ghee, shathab (ruta graveolens), nigella sativa seeds.

References

Cheese
Middle Eastern cuisine
Yemeni cuisine